Sergey Alexandrovich Malinkovich (born 27 May 1975) is a Russian politician, current leader of the Communists of Russia party and founder of the Communists of Petersburg and the Leningrad Oblast.

Sergey Malinkovich was born in Leningrad to a family of schoolteachers. He was engaged in youth politics since 1995, joining the Russian Communist Youth League. In 2000, Malinkovich elected to local council of Smolninskoye Municipal Okrug. In 2001, he left the Communist Party of the Russian Federation due to disagreements with the leadership of this party. In 2003, the public organization "Communists of Petersburg" was created from the former branch of the Union of Communist Youth, and Malinkovich was elected first secretary of the Communists of Petersburg. The organization, later renamed "Communists of Petersburg and the Leningrad Oblast", gained its main popularity thanks to various outrageous statements and provocative actions.

In 2009 Malinkovich joined the newly established Communists of Russia party. He ran unsuccessfully for the Legislative Assembly of Saint Petersburg in 2011, mayor of Petrozavodsk in 2013 and governor of Nenets Autonomous Okrug in 2014. In 2021, he was elected to the Altai Krai Legislative Assembly from Communists of Russia.

On 18 March 2022, the extraordinary congress of the Communists of Russia voted to oust its leader Maxim Suraykin for his alleged connections with "unfriendly countries", fraud and "bourgeois way of life", and appointed Malinkovich instead. Suraykin called the congress "fake" and said that he is still supported by the majority of the party members. In August 2022 Malinkovich was registered to participate in the Tambov Oblast gubernatorial election.

References 

1975 births
Living people
Politicians from Saint Petersburg
Communists of Russia politicians
Communist Party of the Russian Federation members